Zatsepin is a Russian masculine surname, its feminine counterpart is Zatsepina. Notable people with the surname include:

Aleksandr Zatsepin (born 1926), Russian composer
Aleksey Zatsepin (born 1984), Russian swimmer
Eduard Zatsepin (born 1974), Russian footballer
Georgiy Zatsepin (1917–2010), Soviet physicist
Greisen–Zatsepin–Kuzmin limit

Russian-language surnames